The Viking Sagas is a 1995 American film directed by Michael Chapman and starring Ralf Möller and Sven-Ole Thorsen. It is heavily inspired by the Njáls saga, through it features an original plot. It was largely shot on Iceland with a mostly Icelandic cast.

Plot
The story takes place in Iceland around the height of the Viking Age, where a young man, Kjartan (Ralf Möller), must defeat a horde of evil Vikings, intent on taking over his father's land and stealing his girlfriend Gudrun (Ingibjörg Stefánsdóttir) from him too. To help him in this task, Kjartan seeks help from the older Viking Warrior Gunnar (Sven-Ole Thorsen), who trains him to become a fierce fighter, and later aids him in his quest against his archenemy Ketil (Hinrik Ólafsson).

Cast
 Ralf Möller as Kjartan
 Ingibjörg Stefánsdóttir as Gudrun
 Sven-Ole Thorsen as Gunnar
 Þórir Waagfjörð as Bolli
 Hinrik Ólafsson as Ketil (as Hinrik Ólafson)
 Jón Baldvinsson as Thord the Strong
 Gunnar Eyjólfsson as Eirik the White
 Rúrik Haraldsson as Magnus the lawgiver
 Bjørn Floberg as Sighvat
 Raimund Harmstorf as Valgard
 Egill Ólafsson as Hrut the bowman
 Magnús Ólafsson as Bjorn

See also
 List of historical drama films
 Njal's Saga

External links
 
 

1990s action films
1995 films
American historical action films
Icelandic action drama films
English-language Icelandic films
Films based on European myths and legends
Films directed by Michael Chapman
Films scored by George S. Clinton
Films set in the Middle Ages
Films set in the Viking Age
Films set in Iceland
1990s English-language films
1990s American films